Peterborough Lakers may refer to:

Peterborough Lakers (MSL), a Senior A box lacrosse team from Peterborough, Ontario, Canada
Peterborough Lakers Jr. A, a Junior A box lacrosse team from Peterborough, Ontario, Canada